British Formula Renault Championship referred to one of two Formula Renault championships that were held in the United Kingdom. The main series was Renault Sport UK's Formula Renault 2.0 UK championship which was held from 1989 to 2011 and was generally recognized as the British Formula Renault championship. However, in March 2012 it was announced that the Formula Renault UK series would not take place in 2012, with the series being ended definitively in September 2012. A secondary championship organised by the British Automobile Racing Club and known as the Protyre Formula Renault Championship was held continuously between 1995 and 2014. The championship was the only Formula Renault 2.0 championship operating in the United Kingdom after the demise of the main series, but was ended after the 2014 season.

History
The "British Formula Renault Championship", was founded by the British Automobile Racing Club (BARC) in 1989. Renault Sport UK took over the organization of the championship from the following year. This championship was recognized as "British Formula Renault", although the official name of the championship was changed to the "Formula Renault 2.0 UK Championship" in 2005. The BARC organized a second championship in 1995. From then, until 2011, two championships existed in the United Kingdom. However, the BARC championship differed from the UK championship in that it is a mainly amateur series. The BARC championship's Club Class uses old chassis previously used in the UK series. Renault Sport UK also supports the BARC series. In 2000, Tatuus replaced the chassis and it pioneered the modern one make racing series that is common today in GP2 Series, GP3 Series and Formula Renault 3.5 Series.

Several notable Formula One Drivers have raced in the series including Lewis Hamilton, Paul di Resta and Heikki Kovalainen but probably the biggest star from Formula Renault UK was Kimi Räikkönen, the champion in 2000, who made a successful debut in Formula One the next year. This brought keen attention to the different Formula Renault 2.0 Championships and became a chance to found new championships in Italy, Brazil and Asia. Both Räikkönen and then Hamilton went on to become Formula One World Champions in  an  respectively. It then became the reference championship for any aspiring single seater driver to compete in, especially in Western Europe.

In March 2012, it was announced that the Formula Renault UK series would not take place in 2012. This was due to a low number of entries to the championship after only receiving six confirmed competitors, as the price for competing for a season was reaching £200,000. Originally, it was planned by series promoter Stéphane Ratel Organisation that the championship would take a one-year hiatus, leading to a re-launch in 2013. However, it was reported in the media that the series was ended definitively in September 2012.

A new proposal to reintroduce Formula Renault UK was made by the BARC and motorsport promoter Grovewood in 2014. The revived series would be a two-tier championship, with the modern Tatuus FR2.0/13 being used alongside the older machines used in the BARC series. Formula Renault BARC, which had been suffering from declining grid sizes, would be absorbed into the new championship. The plan was dropped after a breakdown in negotiations with Formula Renault's organisers, and the lack of demand for a new junior single-seater series in competition with the new Formula 4
class MSA Formula and BRDC Formula 4. With the failure of the plan, the BARC also dropped their existing Formula Renault series, leaving no dedicated British Formula Renault Championship for 2015. The BARC instead planned to run a Formula Libre category, which would accommodate the existing Formula Renault cars alongside those from other Formulas whose British championships had recently ended.

Formula Renault 2.0 UK

The Renault Sport championship organised an annual regular series, supporting the British Touring Car Championship and UK round of the World Series by Renault, as well as a winter series. The regular series was the main championship and at its peak, held 20 races over 10 meetings.
Originally known as Formula Renault UK the championship used engines of 1,721cc. Between 1995 and 1999 the championship was called Formula Renault Sport UK and used a 2,000cc 8V engine was used. Another name change in 2000 say the series known as Formula Renault 2000 UK before adopting Formula Renault 2.0 UK in 2005. Since 2000 the championship has used 2,000cc 16V engines. The French tyre manufacturer Michelin was the tyre supplier and the title sponsor of the series since 1992.

Several notable Formula One Drivers have raced in the series including Kimi Räikkönen, Lewis Hamilton, Paul di Resta and Heikki Kovalainen.

Graduate Cup
The UK Championship had a secondary class, known as the Graduate Cup. The scheme aimed to help young drivers enter the championship. The highest placed Graduate Cup driver for each round received a trophy on podium and the overall Graduate Cup winner received a discount on the entry fee for the Formula Renault 2.0 UK or Clio Cup UK championships.
To be eligible to race in the Graduate Cup Class drivers had to have competed in no more than two Formula Renault 2.0 race meetings before the current season (except drivers who have previously taken part in the Formula Renault UK Winter Cup or have raced in the Formula Renault BARC Championship) and must be under 19 years of age.

Weekend Format
The weekend started with a Friday testing session at each venue. This was made up of two 25 minute sessions. Saturday consisted of Two 20 minute qualifying sessions which decided the grid for the two 30 minute races, with both held either on the Sunday or the first race on Saturday afternoon and the second race on Sunday. Drivers scored points down to 20th place with two points for fastest lap. Only the best 18 results counted towards the championship with points shared out using the following system:

Champions

Notes

Protyre Formula Renault Championship

The Protyre Formula Renault Championship, organized by the British Automobile Racing Club, began in 1995 as a rival to the Renault Sport UK championship. The series was named Formula Renault BARC Championship to distinguish itself from the Formula Renault 2.0 UK Championship. Most of the regulations relating to the cars are the same as the UK series, but the cars have fixed gear ratios, an intake restrictor to limit engine wear, and are limited to one new set of tyres per outing. The championship used the older Formula Renault Tatuus chassis first introduced to Formula Renault racing in 2000 and updated in 2007, which makes the championship a viable prospect to drivers with lower levels of budget and funding. With the collapse of the Renault Sport championship in early 2012, the BARC Championship became the prominent Formula Renault Championship in the United Kingdom and from 2013, took the name Protyre Formula Renault Championship, dropping the BARC tag after its growth into one of the leading national single seater championships in Great Britain. Despite its initial growth, grid sizes fell in subsequent seasons, and the championship ended in 2014.

Weekend Format
The weekend starts with a general testing session on the Friday. This was made up of two 25 minute sessions. Qualifying is held on Saturday and consists of two 20 minute sessions which decide the grid for the two 30 mile races, with both races held on the Sunday. During the 2012 season, triple header events were introduced. Qualifying for race one and two remains the same, however the race three grid is decided by the second fastest time set during the second qualifying session. During triple header weekends, the first race is held on Saturday with the remaining two races held on the Sunday. Drivers score points down to 20th place with two points for fastest lap. All rounds, less one, count towards the championship with points shared out using the following system:

Latest season

The 2013 Protyre Formula Renault Championship will be the 19th Championship organized by the British Automobile Racing Club and the second year as the UK's only premier Formula Renault 2.0 championship. The season will begin at Donington Park on 14 April and end on 29 September at Silverstone Circuit. The series will form part of the BARC club racing meetings and will expand from fourteen to sixteen rounds at six events all held in England, with four triple header events.

Champions

Teams Participating

The following teams have competed in either the Renault Sport Championship or the BARC Championship.

 Antel Motorsport
 Apotec Scorpio
 Cliff Dempsey Racing
 CORE Motorsport
 Cullen Motorsport
 CRS Racing
 Falcon Motorsport
 Fortec Motorsport
 Hillspeed
 Jamun Racing
 JWA-Avila
 Manor Motorsport
 Manor Competition
 Mark Burdett Motorsport
 MTECH Lite
 Mark Godwin Racing
 RPD Motorsport
 Team DFR
 Scorpio Motorsport
 SWB Motorsport
 Vitulli Racing
 Welch Motorsport

References

External links
Formula Renault 2.0 UK
 
 Official Formula Renault UK media site
Formula Renault BARC
 BARC Formula Renault official website website by Renault Sport UK
 BARC Formula Renault official website website by BARC

Formula Renault 2.0 series
Formula Renault Championship
Defunct auto racing series
National championships in the United Kingdom
Defunct sports competitions in the United Kingdom